The Jazz Etno Funky Festival, often referred to as JEFF, is one of the most popular music festivals in Slovenian Istria; it is held annually in July and August in Koper, in the idyllic ambient of the gardens of the Regional Museum of Koper.

History 
The event was founded in 2003 and today features artists of a wide array of music genres including jazz, funk, world, folk and other styles. It is organised by activists of the SAK - Students' Association of Koper.

Some of the most notable artists who have taken part in JEFF since its inception include: Vasko Atanasovski, Gwen Hughes, Perpetuum Jazzile, Kelvis Ochoa, Terra Folk produkcija, Kisha, Bratko Bibič, New Swing Quartet, Fake orchestra, Olivija, Dazhbog ensemble, Caña Flamenca, Ansasa Trio, Aritmija, Aljoša Jerič, Ratko Dautovski, Vocalissimo, Greentown Jazz Band, Areia, Erik Marenče, Ethnodelia, Die Resonanz, Kaneo, Sedef, Nino Mureškič, Jure Tori, Ewald Oberleitner, K3, Mahnimal, Adrabesa Quartet and many others.

The festival today 
In its current form, the festival lasts six separate days, that is first three Wednesdays in July and first three Wednesdays in August. Apart from the music programme, in recent years the festival has accommodated an ever-increasing number of music and dance workshops, as well as extra-musical activities, ranging from photography exhibitions to culinary and ecology-focused workshops and presentations.

External links 
JEFF's official Myspace
Official website SAK - Students' Association of Koper

Music festivals in Slovenia
Jazz festivals in Slovenia
Music festivals established in 2003
Summer events in Slovenia